The Madonie (Sicilian: Madunìi) are one of the principal mountain ranges on the island of Sicily, located in the Northern part of the island.

Its name comes from the feud of Madonìa which belonged to the noble family of La Farina from Palermo and then to the Marquises Crescimanni of Madonìa.

Geography
The range is located within Palermo Province of Sicily. It is part of the Sicilian extension of the Apennine Mountains System that runs along the Italian Peninsula.

The range includes the next highest elevation mountain summits of Sicily after Mount Etna.

Madonie Regional Natural Park
The mountains were safeguarded in 1989 by the formation of the Madonie Regional Natural Park, a regional natural park.

Madonie Geopark is a member of the European Geoparks Network and the UNESCO Global Network of National Geoparks.

Features
Within the park area, there are outcrops of rocks that have been dated over a 200-million-year period and represent all aspects of the geology of Sicily apart from present-day volcanic activity. There is a wide range of fossils present within the mountains' rocks. Buildings made from these rocks in the Madonie's towns often show visible fossils.

The area was famous for the Circuito Piccolo delle Madonie, where the Targa Florio race was held from 1906 to 1977.

See also

References

External links
—Official Madonie Regional Natural Park website
—UNESCO.org: Madonie Natural Park

Mountain ranges of Sicily
Mountain ranges of the Apennines
Province of Palermo
Mountain ranges of Italy